Metasphaeria is a genus of fungi belonging to the family Saccotheciaceae.

The genus has cosmopolitan distribution.

Species

Species:
 Metasphaeria abuensis 
 Metasphaeria abundans 
 Metasphaeria acanthopanacis

References

Fungi